John McCormack is a former Australian racing driver. Originally from Tasmania, McCormack became one of the leading Formula 5000 racers in Australia during the 1970s.

McCormack won the Australian Drivers' Championship three times, driving an Elfin MR5 Repco Holden in 1973, an Elfin MR6 Repco Holden in 1975 and a McLaren M23-Leyland in 1977. He also won consecutive New Zealand Grand Prix in 1973 and 1974. McCormack was competitive in the Tasman Series and Australian Grand Prix his best results being second in both events. Most of McCormack's major wins were under the banner of the Ansett Team Elfin.

As well as open-wheelers McCormack drove sports sedans, winning the 1974 Toby Lee Sports Sedan Series driving his highly modified Chrysler Valiant Charger-Repco Holden V8 which underneath the Charger shell had specifications virtually identical to those of his Formula 5000 car.

In 1979 McCormack was one of the first drivers to race a Chevrolet Camaro (filling in for fellow F5000 racer Kevin Bartlett who was nursing a broken leg) at the Hardie-Ferodo 1000 at Bathurst. After numerous problems with the big Chev during practice, McCormack and co-driver Bob Forbes started 60th (out of 63), and were a DNF after just 62 laps when the 350ci V8 failed.

Career results

References
 Australian Motor Racing Annual, 1972, page 40
 Australian Competition Yearbook, 1974, pages 59–60
 Australian Competition Yearbook, 1975, pages 46, 146
 Australian Competition Yearbook, 1976, pages 117-119
 Australian Competition Yearbook, 1977, page 85
 Australian Competition Yearbook, 1978, pages 85, 110
 

Year of birth missing (living people)
Living people
Racing drivers from Tasmania
Tasman Series drivers